Roundabout East Anglia was a BBC radio programme providing news and current affairs coverage for the East Anglia region of England during the 1970s. It was broadcast on the area's VHF frequency of BBC Radio 4 as a regional opt-out from the flagship Today programme, from 6.45am to 8.45am each morning.

The programme covered the same geographical area as the BBC's television news programme Look East. It was also broadcast from the same building as Look East, BBC East's regional headquarters at All Saint's Green in Norwich. Presenters who worked on Roundabout East Anglia included Ellis Hill, John Mountford, and Christopher Trace. In addition to the news items there was also lighter, more features-based content such as advice from gardening experts.

Roundabout East Anglia came to an end in mid-1980. This was due both to BBC budgetary cutbacks in regional broadcasting, and because a dedicated BBC Local Radio service was to be introduced to part of the area for the first time, with BBC Radio Norfolk launching in September 1980. Several Roundabout East Anglia personnel transferred to working for Radio Norfolk when that service began, with John Mountford becoming the station's first breakfast show presenter. However, it wasn't until 1990 that Suffolk got its own local BBC radio station.

See also
Morning Sou'West

References

BBC Radio 4 programmes
East of England
East Anglia